WPIO is a Christian radio station licensed to Titusville, Florida, broadcasting on 89.3 MHz FM.  The station is owned by Florida Public Radio, Inc.

Simulcast
WPIO is simulcast in the areas of Dade City, Florida and Bushnell, Florida on 89.3 WKFA.

References

External links
WPIO's official website

PIO
Moody Radio affiliate stations
1975 establishments in Florida
Radio stations established in 1975